Katharine MacGregor is an American political advisor and lobbyist who served as the United States Deputy Secretary of the Interior. She assumed office in February 2020, succeeding David Bernhardt, who was confirmed as Secretary of the Interior.

Education 
MacGregor earned a Bachelor of Arts degree in history and classical studies from the University of Pennsylvania in 2004. As an undergraduate, she studied abroad at the University of St Andrews in Scotland.

Career 
She worked as a lobbyist and was then a congressional staffer for Thelma Drake and Eric Cantor. She was also a staffer on the United States House Committee on Natural Resources from 2011 to 2017. 

In January 2017, she joined the Trump Administration. She previously served as Principal Deputy Assistant Secretary for Land and Minerals Management before her appointment as United States Deputy Secretary of the Interior.

References

External links

Year of birth missing (living people)
Living people
American lobbyists
American political consultants
Trump administration personnel
United States congressional aides
United States Deputy Secretaries of the Interior
University of Pennsylvania alumni
Women government officials